Serine/threonine-protein kinase D3 (PKD3) or PKC-nu  is an enzyme that in humans is encoded by the PRKD3 gene.

Protein kinase C (PKC) is a family of serine- and threonine-specific protein kinases that can be activated by calcium and the second messenger diacylglycerol. PKC family members phosphorylate a wide variety of protein targets and are known to be involved in diverse cellular signaling pathways. PKC family members also serve as major receptors for phorbol esters, a class of tumor promoters. Each member of the PKC family has a specific expression profile and is believed to play a distinct role. The protein encoded by this gene is one of the PKC family members. This kinase can be activated rapidly by the agonists of G protein-coupled receptors. It resides in both cytoplasm and nucleus, and its nuclear accumulation is found to be dramatically enhanced in response to its activation. This kinase can also be activated after B-cell antigen receptor (BCR) engagement, which requires intact phospholipase C gamma and the involvement of other PKC family members.

References

Further reading

EC 2.7.11